Instituto Español Nuestra Señora del Pilar is a Spanish international secondary school in Tétouan, Morocco. Operated by the Spanish Ministry of Education, it serves obligatory secondary education (middle school) and bachillerato (senior high school).

It was first founded by Francisco Javier Delmas, a Marianist, in 1914.

References

External links

 Instituto Español Nuestra Señora del Pilar 
 "Historia del centro" (Archive)

Spanish international schools in Morocco
Tétouan
Educational institutions established in 1914
1914 establishments in Morocco
20th-century architecture in Morocco